was a Japanese castle in what is now the city of Yamatokōriyama, Nara Prefecture, Japan. The Sengoku daimyō Tsutsui Junkei started construction of the castle, and Toyotomi Hidenaga made it his residence. In the Edo period, it became the headquarters of the Kōriyama Domain. During this time it was held by members of the Mizuno, Okudaira Matsudaira, Honda, Fujii Matsudaira, and Yanagisawa clans.

Today, many walls and moats are preserved in a public park in the city. The Yanagisawa Shrine stands on the grounds. The Castle was listed as one of the Continued Top 100 Japanese Castles in 2017.

Photographs

Access

The nearest station is Kintetsu-Kōriyama.

Sources
This article incorporates material from the articles 郡山城 (大和国) (Kōriyama-jō (Yamato no Kuni)) and 郡山藩 (Kōriyama-han) in the Japanese Wikipedia, retrieved on May 4, 2008.

Literature

References

Castles in Nara Prefecture
Yamatokōriyama